Abacetus levis is a species of ground beetle in the sub source  Pterostichinae. It was described by Silento in 1939.

References

levisulcatus
Beetles described in 1939